Hellinsia montufari is a moth of the family Pterophoridae. It is found in Ecuador.

The wingspan is 28 mm. Adults are on wing in January, at an altitude of 3,250 meters

Etymology
The species is named after Montufar, an Ecuadorian freedom fighter, opposing the Spanish.

References

Moths described in 2011
montufari
Moths of South America